Dragoș Benea is a Romanian politician currently serving as a Member of the European Parliament for the Social Democratic Party.

References

Living people
MEPs for Romania 2019–2024
Social Democratic Party (Romania) MEPs
Social Democratic Party (Romania) politicians
Year of birth missing (living people)